Asad Ali (born 14 October 1988) is a Pakistani cricketer who was selected for the Pakistan national cricket team squad in the 2013 ICC Champions Trophy. He is a right-arm fast bowler and bats right-handed.

As recent as 2022, Asad Ali plays cricket in America, and plays in the Philadelphia region.

References

External links
 

1988 births
Living people
Pakistan One Day International cricketers
Pakistan Twenty20 International cricketers
Faisalabad cricketers
Sui Northern Gas Pipelines Limited cricketers
Baluchistan cricketers
Faisalabad Wolves cricketers
Punjab (Pakistan) cricketers
Cricketers from Faisalabad